The San Joaquin Church is a historic church on State Road 162 in Ensenada, New Mexico.  It was built in 1915 and added to the National Register of Historic Places in 1986.

It is a stucco-covered adobe with a corrugated roof and shuttered gothic windows.

See also

National Register of Historic Places listings in Rio Arriba County, New Mexico

References

Roman Catholic churches in New Mexico
Churches on the National Register of Historic Places in New Mexico
Gothic Revival church buildings in New Mexico
Roman Catholic churches completed in 1915
Buildings and structures in Rio Arriba County, New Mexico
National Register of Historic Places in Rio Arriba County, New Mexico
1915 establishments in New Mexico
20th-century Roman Catholic church buildings in the United States